The 1992 World Juniors Track Cycling Championships were the 18th annual Junior World Championships for track cycling held in Athens, Greece in August 1992.

The Championships had five events for men (Sprint, Points race, Individual pursuit, Team pursuit and 1 kilometre time trial) and two for women (Individual pursuit and Sprint).

Events

Medal table

References

UCI Juniors Track World Championships
1992 in track cycling
1992 in Greek sport